John Sheedy is an Australian theatre director, born in Geelong in 1972. He was educated at the National Institute of Dramatic Art (NIDA). Based in Melbourne, he is a director of drama and musicals for the stage as well as opera. He has been described as "a director of bold vision both filmic and theatrical”.

Over the past decade, Sheedy has built up a body of work for theatres in Australia and overseas festivals. He has been a regular guest at Sydney Theatre Company, Belvoir Street Theatre, Sydney Opera House, Black Swan State Theatre Company, Griffin Theatre Company, Bell Shakespeare and the Perth International Arts Festival. His work has been praised for its visceral performances, innovative staging and arresting visual style. His production of The Rabbits (a new opera for Opera Australia with Kate Miller-Heidke) was the fastest selling production in the 2015 Melbourne Festival and the Perth International Arts Festival and received 5 star reviews. His 2014 production of Jasper Jones (an adaptation by Kate Mulvany from Craig Silvey’s novel) and Storm Boy (adapted for the stage by Tom Holloway, based on Colin Thiele's novel of the same name) earned him several best director nominations and awards.

Theatre
Sheedy has a career working with Australian theatre companies. For Belvoir Street Theatre, Sheedy directed Sarah Kane’s play Blasted, Lawrence Mooney’s Sink or Swim and Patricia Cornelius’ play Love ( 2006 ), Sheedy was also Assistant Director on The Lieutenant of Inishmore with Neil Armfield (2004). Sheedy directed a season of Mark Ravenhill’s play Some Explicit Polaroids at Darlinghurst Theatre. Some Explicit Polaroids and Love were both nominated for Best Independent Production at the 2006 Sydney Theatre Awards. For the Sydney Theatre Company Sheedy was Assistant Director to Richard Cottrell on Ying Tong – A Walk with the Goons, which went on to tour Australia and assisted Julian Meyrick on Doubt for its national tour. Sheedy directed several rehearsed play readings of the winning scripts for the Patrick White awards and directed the season of Storm Boy in 2013 and 2015 at the Sydney Theatre Company.

In 2008, 2009 and 2010 Sheedy directed the Actors at Work Program for the Bell Shakespeare Company touring across Australia. For Parramatta Riverside, Sheedy  directed Suzie Miller’s All The Blood And All The Water and Far Away for Black Swan Theatre Company before directing the premiere of the new musical Risky Lunar Love at Sydney’s Carriageworks. In 2008 Sheedy spent three months in New York assisting Edward Albee on a workshop of his play Me, Myself And I, before working with Cicely Berry at the National Theatre Studio script development in London. For Griffin, Sheedy directed Tiger Country and in 2009 Neil LaBute’s The Distance From Here. Sheedy also collaborated with Ross Mueller on a production entitled This Highway Home with a creative workshop held in 2010.

Artistic director
In his first season as the Artistic Director of Barking Gecko Theatre Company, Sheedy wrote for the stage and directed The Amber Amulet adapted from the book by Craig Silvey, which premiered in 2011. In the same year, Sheedy directed a stage adaptation of Shaun Tan’s children’s book The Red Tree, which was adapted by Sheedy with designer Gypsy Taylor and premiered at Barking Gecko Theatre Company in 2011 and re-produced for the 2012 Perth International Arts Festival.

In 2012 he also directed Susie Miller’s Driving into Walls for the 2012 Perth International Arts Festival. Under his direction, Barking Gecko Theatre Company has been nominated for seven Helpmann Awards, including Best Children’s Presentation. The production then toured to the Sydney Opera House and Parramatta Riverside Theatre in June 2013. In 2013, Sheedy directed Hamlet as part of a multi-year partnership with the Western Australia Academy of Performing Arts. In addition he adapted and directed Wolf Erlbruch’s book Duck, Death And The Tulip as part of the 2013 Perth International Arts Festival and directed an adaptation by Tom Holloway of Colin Thiele’s Storm Boy, as a co-production with the Sydney Theatre Company for which he received the Performing Arts WA Award for Best Director (previously WA Equity Awards).

In 2014, Sheedy and playwright Suzie Miller returned to Perth International Arts Festival with a sequel for Driving into Walls called onefivezeroseven, whose script was drawn from interviews with teenagers across Australia, and later in the year Sheedy directed a season of Kate Mulvany’s adaptation of Craig Silvey’s novel Jasper Jones. In 2015, Sheedy adapted and directed The Rabbits, a co-production of Opera Australia and Barking Gecko Theatre Company presented by the 2015 Perth International Arts Festival featuring Kate Miller-Heidke. The production received four 2015 Helpmann Awards including Best Presentation for Children and Best New Australian Work.

Notable productions
 2006 – Love By Patricia Cornelius, Belvoir Street Theatre.
 2007 – Blasted by Sarah Kane, Belvoir Street Theatre.
 2008 – Some explicit Polaroids by Mark Ravenhill, Belvoir Street Theatre.
 2009 – Tiger Country by Jonathan Gavin Griffin Theatre Company
 2009 – Far Away by Carol Churchill, Black Swan State Theatre Company.
 2010 – Attempts on her life by Martin Crimp, NIDA
 2012 – Driving into Walls by Suzie Miller, Perth International Arts Festival and Sydney Opera House.
 2013, 2015 – Storm Boy, Adaptation by Tom Holloway, Sydney Theatre Company
 2014 – Jasper Jones, Adaptation by Kate Mulvany, Barking Gecko Theatre Company. 
 2015 – The Rabbits, Libretto by Lally Katz, Opera Australia

Fellowship award
 2008 – Awarded the Mike Walsh Fellowship.

Awards and nominations
 2006 – Sydney Theatre Critics Award, Best Production, Love.
 2006 – Sydney Theatre Critics Award, Best Production, Some Explicit Polaroids.
 2012 – Helpmann Nomination, Best Presentation for Children, The Red Tree.
 2013 – WA Equity Awards Nomination, Best production, Driving into Walls.
 2014 – Sydney Theatre Critics Award, Best Production, Storm Boy.
 2014 – Glug Award, Best Production, Storm Boy. Winner.
 2014 – Helpmann Nomination, Best Presentation for Children, Storm Boy.
 2014 – WA Equity Award, Best Direction for a play, Duck, Death and the Tulip. Winner.
 2014 – WA Equity Award, Best Direction for a play, Storm Boy. Winner.
 2015 – WA Equity Award, Best Director for a play, Onefivezeroseven.
 2015 – WA Equity Award, Best Direction for a play, Jasper Jones.
 2015 – Helpmann Award, Best New Australian Work, "The Rabbits".
 2015 – Helpmann Award, Best Presentation for Children, "The Rabbits".

Boards and panels
 2015 – Publication of  “Why Theatre?” Revitalise Platform Paper by Sheedy with Jonathan Holloway (Playlab and Drama Queensland).
 2014 – Key Note Speaker for Revitalize 2014, Drama Queensland Professional Development Conference.
 2014 – Serving board member of the course advisory group for the Masters of Fine Arts undergraduate studies, NIDA.
 2013 – Judging panel, Patrick White Award, STC.
 2010 – 2014 Founding board member of The Dog Theatre, Melbourne.
 2007 – 2011 – Audition Selection Panel for the full-time Acting course, NIDA

References

Australian theatre directors
Australian opera directors
Living people
1972 births